The Test d'évaluation du français (TEF) is a test of fluency in French for non-native speakers. It is awarded by the CCIP. It is often required to be admitted into universities and is recognized by the Federal government of Canada as a proof of fluency in immigration procedures.

The test is made up of three mandatory and two optional sections. The reading, listening, grammar and vocabulary sections are mandatory and must be taken together, while the writing and speaking sections are optional and can be taken separately.

NB. The Federal Government of Canada requires both mandatory and optional section for immigration purposes.

External links
 CCIP

French language tests